Hamamlı may refer to:

Hamamlı, Artvin
Hamamlı, Manyas
Hamamlu, East Azerbaijan